The St. Regis Washington, D.C. known for many years as The Carlton Hotel, is an historic hotel located at 923 16th and K Streets, N.W. in Washington, D.C. two blocks north of the White House.

History
The Beaux-Arts and Neo-Renaissance style luxury hotel was built as The Carlton Hotel in 1926 by local developer Harry Wardman. It was designed by architect Mihran Mesrobian. Cordell Hull lived there during World War II.

Wardman was forced to sell the hotel in 1930, due to the Great Depression. The hotel was then resold in 1953  to Sheraton Hotels, which renamed the hotel the Sheraton-Carlton Hotel.

The Sheraton-Carlton closed for extensive renovations from December 1987 to October 2, 1988, at a cost of $16 million. Soon after reopening in 1988, the hotel's name reverted to The Carlton Hotel. In 1999, it was renamed The St. Regis Washington, D.C.

Claret Capital, a real estate investment firm based in Dublin, Ireland, purchased the hotel in 2007 for about $170 million.  Claret renovated the property in 2008. But the Great Recession significantly hurt both the luxury hotel industry and the Irish economy, and Claret Capital was not able to continue making payments on the loan it secured from Barclays Capital. Barclays foreclosed on the hotel in September 2010, and announced plans to auction off the property.

Westbrook Partners, a real estate investment firm based in New York City, purchased the St. Regis from Barclays in May 2011 for $100 million. Westbrook renovated the lobby and main bar in 2013. That same year, the hotel's high-end restaurant, Adour, closed and was replaced by a more moderately priced establishment, Decanter, which was owned and managed by the hotel itself.

"The Pursuit of a Legacy: The Mehran Mesrobian History and Heritage Tour of the St. Regis Washington D.C." – an hour-long history and heritage tour of the property for guests of the hotel and the public - ran on Thursdays and Fridays at 5:00 PM from October 2013 through July 2014. The experience was led by the hotel's Cultural Attaché. The tour was the first of its kind in Washington, D.C., and took participants through the hotel's extraordinary 87-year history, from its inception to the modern day.

Westbrook Partners sold the St. Regis Hotel to Al Rayyan Tourism Investment Co. (ARTIC), a hotel and resort investment company based in Qatar, for an undisclosed sum in July 2015. ARTIC said that the hotel would continue to be branded a St. Regis.

The hotel is listed on the National Register of Historic Places, and is designated as a contributing property to the Sixteenth Street Historic District.

Ratings and reviews
The AAA gave the hotel four diamonds out of five in 2008. The hotel has maintained that rating every year, and received four diamonds again for 2016. Forbes Travel Guide (formerly known as Mobil Guide) awarded the hotel four out of five stars as well in 2016.

References

External links
 

 

Hotel buildings on the National Register of Historic Places in Washington, D.C.
Hotel buildings completed in 1926
Historic district contributing properties in Washington, D.C.
Hotels in Washington, D.C.
Washington, D.C.
Sheraton hotels